Real de plata is a Spanish term, translated as: "silver real", a historic silver coin and standard currency.

Spanish colonial real Spanish: real de plata; currency standard and silver coin; eight to the Spanish dollar
Mexican real, a silver Spanish colonial real coin or a silver standard coin and currency of Mexico 1822-1897
Spanish real, a historic silver coin
Philippine real, a silver Spanish colonial real coin or a silver coin of the Philippines 19th century
Paraguayan real, a silver Spanish colonial real coin or a silver coin of Paraguay 19th century
Peruvian real, a silver Spanish colonial real coin or a silver coin of Peru 19th century
Ecuadorian real, a silver Spanish colonial real coin or a silver coin of Ecuador 19th century
Honduran real, a silver Spanish colonial real coin or a silver coin of Honduras 19th century
Costa Rican real, a silver Spanish colonial real coin or a silver coin of Costa Rica 19th century
Central American Republic real, currency standard and silver coin of the Central American Republic